Alain Nadaud (5 July 1948 – 12 June 2015) was a French novelist, writer and diplomat. He was born in Paris and studied literature at Nanterre, obtaining a master's degree. Nadaud then taught literature abroad, in Nouakchott, Mauritania and in Basra, Iraq. After completing a doctorate, he went abroad again to teach French in Kwara state in Nigeria. Back in Paris, he taught philosophy until 1985.

After the publication of his first novel Archéologie du zéro in 1984, Nadaud joined the publisher Denoël, where he was in charge of manuscripts. After a stint with Ramsay, he worked at Balland and then Belfond. He wrote for numerous journals before founding the literary magazine Quai Voltaire.  Known for his historical novels, he won the Prix Mediterranee for Auguste fulminant.

Appointed to the French embassy in Tunisia in 1994, Nadaud later served as cultural attaché at the French consulate in Quebec.

Novels
 Archéologie du zéro, Denoël, 1984 
 L'Envers du temps, Denoël, 1985
 Désert physique, Denoël, 1987
 L'Iconoclaste, Quai Voltaire, 1989
 La Mémoire d'Érostrate, Le Seuil, 1992
 Le Livre des malédictions, Grasset, 1995
 Auguste fulminant, Grasset, 1997
 Une aventure sentimentale, Verticales, 1999
 La Fonte des glaces, Grasset, 2000
 Les Années mortes, Grasset, 2004
 Le Vacillement du monde, Actes Sud, 2006
 Si Dieu existe, Albin Michel, 2007
 Le passage du col, Albin Michel, 2009
 La plage des demoiselles, Éditions Léo Scheer, 2010
 D'écrire j'arrête, Tarabuste Éditeur, 2010

Other works
 La Tache aveugle, Éditeurs français réunis, 1980 (réédition Messidor 1990).
 Voyage au pays des bords du gouffre, Denoël, 1986.
 L'Iconolâtre, Tarabuste, 1995.
 Petit catalogue des nations barbares, L'Or du temps, Tunis, 1999.
 Ivre de livres, Balland, 1989.
 Malaise dans la littérature, Champ Vallon, 1993.
 Aux portes des enfers, enquête géographique littéraire et historique, Actes Sud, 2004.
 La Représentation, Dumerchez, 1991 (play)
 Vilas Sarang : Le Terroriste et autres récits, Denoël, 1988 (translation)

References

1948 births
2015 deaths
20th-century French novelists
21st-century French novelists
Writers from Paris
French male novelists
20th-century French male writers
21st-century French male writers
Diplomats from Paris